Sir John Fowell, 3rd Baronet (12 December 1665 – 26 November 1692) of Fowelscombe in the parish of Ugborough in Devon, was an English politician who sat in the House of Commons  from 1689 to 1692.

Origins
Fowell was the son and heir of Sir John Fowell, 2nd Baronet (1623–1677), of Fowelscombe, by his wife Elizabeth Chichester (d.1678), a daughter of Sir John Chichester (1598-1669) of Hall in the parish of Bishop's Tawton in Devon, Member of Parliament for Lostwithiel in Cornwall in 1624.

Career
He inherited the baronetcy on the death of his father in 1677.
In 1689 Fowell was elected Member of Parliament for Totnes in Devon, and sat until his death in 1692. He was one of the 151 MPs who voted against making the Prince of Orange king, but in favour of  declaring Princess Mary queen.

Death and succession
Fowell died unmarried at the age of 26 when the baronetcy became extinct. His heirs were his two surviving sisters, who until 1711 held the Fowell estates of Fowelscombe and Ludbrooke in co-parcenary:
Elizabeth Fowell (d.post-1680), who in 1679 married (as his 1st wife) George Parker (1651-1743) of Boringdon in the parish of Colebrook, and of North Molton, both in Devon. The marriage was without progeny, but by his second wife Anne Buller, George Parker was the grandfather of John Parker, 1st Baron Boringdon (d. 1788), whose son was John Parker, 1st Earl of Morley (1772–1840) of Saltram House.
Margaret Fowell, who in 1679 married (as his 1st wife) Arthur Champernowne of Dartington, Devon, and was the mother of Arthur Champernowne (d.1717) of Dartington, MP for Totnes.

In 1711 a division of the estates took place, with Fowelscombe going to the Champernowne family, which held it until 1758,

References

1665 births
1692 deaths
Baronets in the Baronetage of England
English MPs 1689–1690
English MPs 1690–1695
Members of the Parliament of England (pre-1707) for Totnes